Gripwood Quarry is a 2.9 hectare geological Site of Special Scientific Interest at Bradford-on-Avon, Wiltshire, England, notified in 1951. 

The quarry lies in a field to the south west of the Bradford-on-Avon Tithe Barn, on the south side of the River Avon. It cuts into Oolitic limestone and has a wall in the middle creating an upper and a lower quarry, last used for mushroom growing. The walls are whitewashed and there is a large wooden crane.

Aliases

 Jones Hill Quarry – name used by Wiltshire Council.
 Bradford-on-Avon 9 – name given by Mendip Cave Rescue.
 Ruins – the older lower section was known by this name by the mushroom workers.
 ST86SW468 – SMR number, Wiltshire and Swindon Sites and Monument Record Search.
 Woodside Quarry – Gripwood was the underground and Woodside the opencast; the name Woodside sometimes applies to both.

Sources

 Natural England citation sheet for the site (accessed 1 April 2022)

External links
 Natural England website (SSSI information)
 MCRA Resource
https://www.darkplaces.co.uk/phpbb/wiki.php?wakka=GripwoodQuarry (login required)

Sites of Special Scientific Interest in Wiltshire
Sites of Special Scientific Interest notified in 1951
Quarries in Wiltshire